A series of bomb attacks, which continued  with about 200 bombs up to that date, started in the capital of Chile, Santiago, in 2005.

The bombings
The bombs were constructed by placing gunpowder inside a fire extinguisher. About two-thirds of bombs detonated, with the remainder defused. Targets include banks (about a third of bombs), police stations, army barracks, churches, embassies, the headquarters of political parties, company offices, courthouses and government buildings. The bombs mostly detonate at night, and there have been few injuries amongst passers-by, none serious. The only fatality was a young anarchist, Mauricio Morales, who was killed in May 2009 by a bomb he was carrying. In 2011 another anarchist, Luciano Pitronello, was severely injured by a bomb he was planting.

Claims of responsibility and notable incidents
Around 80 different groups claimed responsibility for the attacks; authorities do not know if they are dealing with a group that continually changes its name, or many separate cells. Some groups name themselves after past anarchists worldwide, including Leon Czolgosz, who assassinated US President William McKinley in 1901, and Jean-Marc Rouillan, a jailed French left-wing militant. "The friends of gunpowder" has also been used.

2006

2008

2009

2010

2011

2012

2013

2014

2018

2020

Aftermath
Several suspects were arrested and prosecuted, but most were acquitted. Injured bomber Pitronello was tried, but convicted only of lesser offences and sentenced to house arrest. Hans Niemeyer, a Chilean sociologist and anarchist, was sentenced to five years' imprisonment for planting a bomb in a bank in November 2011. Authorities were investigating links between anarchist groups in Chile and Europe. Two Chilean anarchists who had been tried and acquitted in Chile were later arrested in Spain, and charged with planting a bomb in a church in Zaragoza in 2013, an attack claimed by a group named after Mateu Morral, a Spanish anarchist who attempted to assassinate the King of Spain in 1906. In 2010 a letter bomb was addressed to the Chilean embassy in Athens. An opinion poll in 2014 found that about two-thirds of Chileans feared the attacks and felt that the problem was escalating, with nearly 30 bombs in 2014 by August.

See also

2014 Santiago subway bombing
List of terrorist incidents
Terrorism in Chile

References

History of Santiago, Chile
Terrorist incidents in Chile
2005 crimes in Chile
21st century in Santiago, Chile
2000s crimes in Chile
 
 
Terrorist incidents in South America in 2005
Terrorist incidents in South America in 2014